Petropavlovka is a rural locality (a village) in Bakaldinsky Selsoviet, Arkhangelsky District, Bashkortostan, Russia. The population was 14 as of 2010. There is 1 street.

Geography 
Petropavlovka is located 24 km east of Arkhangelskoye (the district's administrative centre) by road. Usakly is the nearest rural locality.

References 

Rural localities in Arkhangelsky District